Carola Dibbell (born April 4, 1945) is an American music journalist and author.

Biography
Dibbell was born in New York City and grew up in Greenwich Village. She attended Hunter College High School and is a graduate of Radcliffe College.

Her short stories have appeared in the New Yorker, Paris Review, and other publications. She has also written music and film reviews, as well as articles about children's media, for the Village Voice. Her first book, the sci-fi novel The Only Ones, was published by Two Dollar Radio in 2015. The Washington Posts Nancy Hightower named it one of the best science fiction books of 2015.

Dibbell married music critic Robert Christgau, who  introduced her to music criticism in 1974. They adopted a daughter, Nina Dibbell Christgau, and as of 2022 have long lived in New York.

References

External links

1945 births
Living people
American women journalists
American music journalists
Radcliffe College alumni
American women short story writers
American science fiction writers
The New Yorker people
Women writers about music
Women science fiction and fantasy writers
The Village Voice people
People from Greenwich Village
21st-century American women